Donald Lee Stewart (born October 25, 1939) is an American Pentecostal minister and purported faith healer. He is a televangelist who hosts Power and Mercy on Black Entertainment Television, The Word Network, and other television channels. He is the successor to the late A. A. Allen's organization.

Origins and early ministry 
According to his official biography, Stewart is the youngest of six children, and at age 13, Don had developed a severe bone disease. After four major surgeries, when he was 15 years old, "God miraculously healed him. , he lives in a $2.5 million Paradise Valley, Arizona, home owned by his church, and his family earns hundreds of thousands of dollars from his church. The Arizona Republic reports "His ministry, the Don Stewart Association, operates out of a nondescript warehouse in an industrial park near Interstate 17." Stewart's son, Brendon Stewart, conducts his own "Miracle Crusades."

Stewart first worked with Allen, starting with "pounding tent stakes at Allen's revivals to driving a truck to preaching". One of Allen's rising young evangelistic proteges during the early 1960s along with the likes of R. W. Schambach and Leroy Jenkins, Stewart served as evangelist and secretary treasurer of Allen's organization, and "was hit with allegations of embezzlement by Allen's brother-in-law, of pocketing offerings from the revivals" in the wake of Allen's death. When the controversial Allen died from alcohol poisoning as a result of an alcoholic binge in 1970, Stewart tried to clean up Allen's room before the police came. After Allen's death, Stewart gained complete possession of Allen's organization, including his Miracle Valley property, and renamed Allen's Miracle Life Fellowship International the Don Stewart Evangelistic Association (and later the Don Stewart Association).

From 1979 until early 1983, the Christ Miracle Healing Church and Center led by Frances Thomas, a disciple of Allen's, purchased and occupied land on Miracle Valley's subdivision property across Highway 92 from the bible church. The fundamentalist, cult-like church and its 300 members had several confrontations with utility workers, neighbors and eventually law enforcement resulting in what became known as the Miracle Valley shootout. This confrontation resulted in the shooting deaths of two of its senior members and injuries to multiple sheriff's deputies. Immigrants from Chicago and Mississippi rioted, which resulted in the death of Therial Davis, a six-year-old. The land was abandoned within a couple of weeks. The Don Stewart organization was not affiliated with the CMHCC.

In 1982, Miracle Valley's main administration building and vast warehouse were set on fire by arson, which resulted in the total destruction of the facilities. The main building was valued at $2 million. Stewart sent multiple donation requests to some people on his 100,000 person mailing list "even though his ministry is not associated with the college and the fire damage was insured." According to the press, one of his letters "gave the impression ... the fire had crippled Stewart's ministry" and another purported to include the buildings ashes with a request for $200 donations. He was "accused by another church of committing arson for an insurance payoff." His own church had issues over Stewart's financing and "questioned Stewart's fundraising techniques" before.

Current work and controversy 
The Don Stewart Association controls "Feed My People," the "Southwest Indian Children's Fund", and "Miracle Life Fellowship International" (with offices in the Philippines). Additionally, Stewart also started the Northern Arizona Food Bank, which is operated by his association and directed by Kerry Ketcum. Stewart's organizations in the early 1990s as well as more recently have been criticized for not making its expenditures public. In 1992, USA Today cited Feed My People/Don Stewart Association among a group of organizations that "did not reply to BBB disclosure requests." In 1993, the Washington Post reported, "Feed My People International, an arm of the Don Stewart Association (a church)" sends "Prospective donors get heart-rending letters on behalf of starving children, with virtually no facts about where and how the money is distributed. Three watchdog groups have asked for details and been turned down." In 2008, the Better Business Bureau reported, the Don Stewart Association "did not provide requested information. As a result, the Better Business Bureau cannot determine if it meets standards."

Then in 1997, The Business Journal reported that the Internal Revenue Service was investigating Stewart's organization for mail fraud concerning high salaries and an $8 million annual income. After an investigation, the IRS "revoked the tax exemption of the Phoenix-based Don Stewart Association." Among the reasons for the IRS revoking tax exemption was "impermissible benefits" to the Stewart family. As of 2008, according to the IRS, it is currently tax-exempted.

In 1998, the Washington Post reported, Don Stewart's "followings all but disappeared after investigations," but he has "joined dozens of other preachers to become fixtures on BET." Consequently, Stewart along with Peter Popoff and Robert Tilton received "criticism from those who say that preachers with a long trail of disillusioned followers have no place on a network that holds itself out as a model of entrepreneurship for the black community."

G. Richard Fisher, of The Quarterly Journal, has been critical of Stewart's prosperity theology teachings and purported healing miracles. The national U.S. television program Inside Edition with the Trinity Foundation investigated Stewart's wealth and fundraising practices. In 1996, the Dallas Morning News noted that some of Stewart's fundraising letters were written by Gene Ewing, who heads a multimillion-dollar marketing empire, writing donation letters for other evangelicals like WV Grant, Robert Tilton, Rex Humbard, and Oral Roberts. Included in some of Stewart's fundraising letters was Stewart's green "prayer cloth" with claims that it has supernatural healing power. Stewart's television programs and website currently offer the "Green Prosperity Prayer Handkerchief" which he claims people can use "to receive abundant blessings of financial prosperity". In a 2009 Skeptic article, Marc Carrier wrote about Stewart's handkerchief and his financial earnings explaining the handkerchief is a "mere 17x17 cm" and came with a letter requesting a "seed faith" in the amount of "$500, $100, $50, or $30". Carrier wrote the "seed faith" request included anonymous letters linking donations to new personal wealth, which was a way for Stewart to increase donations his organization receives.

Stewart produces many DVDs and "healing packages" in addition to his three books. His most recent book is from 2007 titled Healing: The Brain Soul Connection with Daniel Amen. In the book, Stewart says he has ADD and has a special interest in helping those mental and emotional difficulties. He also wrote Only Believe, a history of the early Latter Rain Movement that includes Oral Roberts, Kathryn Kuhlman, A. A. Allen and Benny Hinn. The Don Stewart Association sells many books, DVDs, and "healing/miracle" packages. Stewart's faith healing services include live video streaming, live email testimonies and prayer requests, and cell phone prayer.

In May 2009, The Arizona Republic examined 22 charities tied to the Don Stewart Association, which claim to be independent, but with links via association employees, pastors, and their wives, parents, children and in-laws operated 16 of the 22 charities from tax years 2003 to 2005. The paper revealed Stewart's association spent the bulk of its money on salaries and expenses such as a Hummer H2 and $80,000 for a tract of farmland in Montana, purchased from the family of a hunger charity's president. Later that month Arizona's attorney general's office began reviewing its practices to decide whether any action should be taken. Following the report in September 2009, The Arizona Republic reported St. Mary's Food Bank Alliance in Phoenix broke contact with Northern Arizona Food Bank and the Stewart Association was being investigated by the federal government. The Don Stewart Association would no longer comment to The Republic.

Books by Stewart

References

External links 
 

Operated by Don Stewart Association
 Southwest Indian Children's Fund
 Northern Arizona Food Bank
 Feed My People International

American television evangelists
American faith healers
1939 births
Living people
People from Prescott, Arizona
American Assemblies of God pastors